Fernando González was the defending champion, but was unable to play due to an injury.

Seeds

Draw

Finals

Top half

Bottom half

External links
Draw
Qualifying Draw

Singles